Kalmykovo (Qalmıq) is a rural locality (a village) in Badrakovsky Selsoviet, Burayevsky District, Bashkortostan, Russia. The population was 56 as of 2010. There are 2 streets.

Geography 
Kalmykovo is located 13 km southwest of Burayevo (the district's administrative centre) by road. Starobikmetovo is the nearest rural locality.

References 

Rural localities in Burayevsky District